Brock Hall is an unincorporated area and census-designated place in eastern Prince George's County, Maryland, United States, located south of Largo and Bowie,   and north of Upper Marlboro.  As of the 2020 census, the CDP had a population of 13,181.

Geography
U.S. Route 301 forms the eastern boundary of the community.

Demographics

2020 census

Note: the US Census treats Hispanic/Latino as an ethnic category. This table excludes Latinos from the racial categories and assigns them to a separate category. Hispanics/Latinos can be of any race.

Government and infrastructure
Prince George's County Police Department District 2 Station is in Brock Hall and has a Bowie postal address.

Education
Prince George's County Public Schools operates public schools serving the census-designated place.

Elementary schools serving sections of the CDP are Arrowhead, Barack Obama, Patuxent, and Pointer Ridge. Most of the CDP is zoned to Kettering Middle School, with portions zoned instead to Benjamin Tasker and James Madison middle schools. The CDP is served by Dr. Henry A Wise, Jr. High School, Largo High School, and Bowie High School.

The CDP also houses Imagine Foundations at Leeland Charter School. The  campus, which had seven buildings as of 2011, built for the defunct Queen Anne School.

Queen Anne School was established in 1964 by St. Barnabas' Episcopal Church, Leeland. It had 11 students in its first year and 30 students the following year. Eventually it had almost 300 students, but at one point its enrollment declined. By 2011 the school had only 94 students left and the administration announced it was closing. The charter school announced that year that it was moving into the campus

Culture
St. Barnabas' Episcopal Church, Leeland is in Brock Hall.

References

Census-designated places in Maryland
Census-designated places in Prince George's County, Maryland